Frankie O'Dell is an American professional poker player residing in Long Beach, California. He has won three World Series of Poker bracelets in Omaha Hi-Lo Split. His first win came in the 2003 World Series of Poker in the $1,500 event, his second in the $2,000 event in 2007, and the third in the $10,000 Omaha Hi-Lo Championship in 2019. O'Dell is the only player to have won three WSOP Omaha Hi-Lo events.

At the $9,700 World Poker Tour Championship Event at the 2006 Legends of Poker, O'Dell finished runner-up to Joe Pelton, earning $776,385. He also finished second in the $1,500 Dealers Choice event at the 2018 WSOP.

As of 2019, O'Dell has tournament winnings that exceed $2,900,000.

World Series of Poker bracelets

References

American poker players
World Series of Poker bracelet winners
Living people
People from Long Beach, California
Year of birth missing (living people)